Colin Scott (born 23 March 1960) is an Australian former rugby league footballer who played in the 1970s and 1980s.

Background
Born in Charters Towers, Queensland, Scott is of Indigenous descent and played his junior rugby league for Souths Townsville, alongside future teammate Gene Miles.

Playing career
Scott played senior rugby league for Souths Townsville, where he first represented Queensland in the interstate series in 1979. In 1980, he moved to Brisbane, joining the Easts Tigers. That season, he was selected at fullback for the first ever State of Origin game, despite being in reserve grade at the time.

In 1981, Scott moved to the Wynnum Manly Seagulls, starting at fullback in their BRL's Grand Final victory over Souths Magpies a year later. In 1983, Scott was selected at fullback in the Australian side for their second Test match against New Zealand after an injury to incumbent 1982 Kangaroo Tour fullback Greg Brentnall. Despite 25 appearances for his state during his career (including 17 State of Origin appearances), Scott did not represent Australia again. 

In 1985, Scott joined the Castleford Tigers (Heritage № 654), spending two seasons with the club. That year, he played  in their 18–22 loss to the Hull Kingston Rovers in the 1985 Yorkshire County Cup Final during the 1985–86 season.

Scott played for Queensland in the interstate series and State of Origin series from 1979 to 1987, until losing his place to former Souths Magpies and then-Canberra Raiders fullback Gary Belcher in 1986, though he was recalled to the team on the wing for the 1987 State of Origin series, mostly due to injury to regular Maroons centre and goal kicker Mal Meninga. During the series, Scott came in for heavy criticism for his poor goal kicking. Scott played his last game for Queensland from the bench in 1987 series exhibition game at Veterans Memorial Stadium in California.

In 1988, Scott joined the newly established Brisbane Broncos, who were admitted to the New South Wales Rugby League premiership. He spent just one season at the club, playing 14 games, including their first ever premiership game against the Manly Warringah Sea Eagles.

Post-playing career
In 2000, Scott was awarded the Australian Sports Medal for his contribution to Australia's international standing in rugby league.

Footnotes

References

External links

Colin Scott at unofficial Foley Shield website
Queensland representatives at qrl.com.au
Colin Scott at thecastlefordtigers.co.uk

1960 births
Living people
Australia national rugby league team players
Australian rugby league players
Australian expatriate sportspeople in England
Brisbane Broncos players
Brisbane rugby league team players
Castleford Tigers players
Indigenous Australian rugby league players
People from North Queensland
Queensland Rugby League State of Origin players
Recipients of the Australian Sports Medal
Rugby league fullbacks
Rugby league wingers
Rugby league players from Queensland
Wynnum Manly Seagulls players